Mary Rose McGeady (June 28, 1928, Hazleton, Pennsylvania - September 13, 2012, Albany, New York) was an American Catholic religious sister who was widely acknowledged for her work with homeless youth in the United States. She was notably the director of Covenant House from 1990-2003.

References
Further reading

1928 births
2012 deaths
20th-century American Roman Catholic nuns
21st-century American Roman Catholic nuns